The 31st Sports Emmy Awards were presented on April 26, 2010 at the Frederick P. Rose Hall at the Jazz at Lincoln Center in New York City.

Awards

Programs

Personalities

Technical

References

 031
Sports Emmy Awards
Sports Emmy Awards
Sports Emmy